This England (originally titled This Sceptred Isle), is a 2022 British television docudrama miniseries written by Michael Winterbottom and Kieron Quirke.  It depicts the first wave of the COVID-19 pandemic in the United Kingdom based on testimonies of people in the Boris Johnson administration, on the various intergovernmental advisory groups (including the Scientific Advisory Group for Emergencies), and in other affected British institutions such as care homes and hospitals. It premiered on Sky Atlantic and Now on 28 September 2022.  Kenneth Branagh stars as Boris Johnson, and Ophelia Lovibond as Carrie Symonds.

Background
Boris Johnson wins a landslide victory in the December 2019 general election under the Get Brexit Done slogan, but within a few months faces the COVID-19 pandemic in the United Kingdom, for which he is ultimately hospitalised, and the birth of his first child with his then partner Carrie Symonds.

Cast

 Kenneth Branagh as Boris Johnson
 Simon Paisley Day as Dominic Cummings
 Ophelia Lovibond as Carrie Symonds
 Andrew Buchan as Matt Hancock
 Derek Barr as Lee Cain
 James Corrigan as Isaac Levido
 Jimmy Livingstone as Prof. Chris Whitty
 Simon Lowe as James Slack
 Philip Buck as Martin Reynolds
 Neil Stuke as Senior Civil Servant, Department of Health
 Shri Patel as Rishi Sunak
 Aimée Kelly as Alison and Elise Larkin
 Joe Bannister as Jack Doyle
 Greta Bellamacina as Cleo Watson
 Rina Mahoney as Julie
 Olivier Huband as Jamie Njoku-Goodwin
 Adrian Harris as Duncan Selbie
 Alec Nicholls as Sir Patrick Vallance
 Ben Lloyd-Hughes as Ben Gascoigne
 Michael Colgan as Gabriel Milland
 Salima Saxton as Teena
 Wasim Zakir as Dr. Amir Hamdi
 Tom Andrews as Dr. Tom Armstrong
 Justin Edwards as Mark Sedwill
 Lee Comley as Ben
 Ravin J. Ganatra as Roshan
 Helen Monks as Jodie
 Albin Calderon as Manny
 Heather Peace as Mary Wakefield
 Ruth Redman as Yvonne Doyle
 Isabella Javor as Lara
 Roisin Rae as Sally
 Joan Walker as Sharon Peacock
 Adam Oakley as Government Press Advisor (uncredited)
 Rachel Sophia-Anthony as Lola Aldenjana (uncredited)
 Julie Williamson as Downing Street Staff (uncredited)
 Michael Barron as Baron Eddie Lister (uncredited)
 Jarek Ciepichal as Police Protection Officer (uncredited)
 Richard Tree as Downing Street Staff (uncredited)
 Tony Hood as Security Guard No. 10 (uncredited)

Tim Harford, Kate Lawson and Richard Vadon also appear as themselves presenting More or Less.

Episodes

Production
The miniseries was announced in June 2020 as This Sceptred Isle. It was co-written by Michael Winterbottom and Kieron Quirke. Kenneth Branagh's casting as Boris Johnson was announced in January 2021. The series was produced by Fremantle, Passenger and Revolution Films, with Richard Brown of Passenger and Melissa Parmenter of Revolution Films serving as executive producers. 

All episodes were originally set to be directed by Winterbottom, but after the miniseries began filming in February 2021, Winterbottom stepped down from directing in March, reportedly due to health issues. He was replaced by Julian Jarrold. Tim Shipman, the political editor of The Sunday Times, is acting as a consultant. In March 2021, Ophelia Lovibond and Simon Paisley Day joined the cast as Carrie Symonds and Dominic Cummings. 

In 2022, it was announced that Sky had changed the title from This Sceptred Isle to This England. Both phrases are taken from the same passage in Shakespeare's Richard II. The miniseries was set to premiere on 21 September 2022; however on 9 September 2022 the premiere was pushed back to 28 September 2022, in respect of the UK period of mourning for the late Queen Elizabeth II.

Reception
The series received mixed reviews,  with some British critics feeling that it was too soon for such a drama.  The Independent said: "here comes the show that precisely nobody was asking for".  The New York Times said it "debuted with solid ratings" and said, "It adds up to a heartbreaking depiction of the pressure on health workers, and the fear, pain and often lonely deaths of those hooked up to ventilators". The Times praised the series and called it "An impressive enterprise but not an easy watch".  The Irish Times said "If you can stomach the material, this show is hugely watchable".  

Branagh was praised for his performance, with The Times calling it mesmerising.  The Guardian and New Statesman felt the series was overly sympathethic to Johnson, as well as sanitised and detatched from the front line experience. The NME praised the series, but said that the format "takes some getting used to" as it oscillates between harrowing scenes in hospitals to events that resemble the 2005 BBC political satire, The Thick of It.

See also
Brexit: The Uncivil War, a 2019 film featuring Dominic Cummings and Boris Johnson
COVID-19 pandemic in popular culture
Boris Johnson in popular culture
 Politics in fiction

References

External links
 
 
 This England Sky official trailer

Sky Atlantic original programming
Television series by Fremantle (company)
English-language television shows
Television series set in 2020
2022 British television series debuts
2022 British television series endings
2020s British drama television series
2020s British political television series
2020s British television miniseries
2020s British workplace drama television series
British political drama television series
Media depictions of the COVID-19 pandemic in the United Kingdom
Television shows about the COVID-19 pandemic
Cultural depictions of Boris Johnson
Television series about prime ministers